Barranquilla may refer to a number of places:
Colombia
Barranquilla, Atlántico Department, 4th largest city of Colombia
Barranquilla Betania, Antioquia Department, Colombia
Barranquilla, Cundinamarca Department, Colombia
Trinidad, Colombia Guaviare Department, Colombia, also known as Barranquilla
Barranquilla (Atacama), Chile
Puente La Barranquilla, Guatemala
La Barranquilla, Honduras
Barranquilla, Mexico
Panama
Barranquilla, Bocas del Toro Province
Barranquilla, Cocle Province
Barranquilla, Venezuela